The , formerly (until March 2015) known as the , is a Japanese funicular line operated by the Sarakurayama Tozan Railway Company. The line climbs Mount Sarakura in Kitakyūshū, Fukuoka. The company is fully owned by the city of Kitakyūshū. It opened in 1957.

The company also operates . It links the funicular terminus and the top of the mountain.

Basic data
Distance: 
Gauge: .
Stations: 2
Vertical interval: .

See also
Mount Sarakura
List of funicular railways
List of railway companies in Japan
List of railway lines in Japan

References

External links 
 

Funicular railways in Japan
Rail transport in Fukuoka Prefecture
1067 mm gauge railways in Japan
1957 establishments in Japan